Thiseltonia is a genus of Australian plants in the pussy's-toes tribe within the daisy family.

Species
The only known species is Thiseltonia gracillima, native to Western Australia.

References

Monotypic Asteraceae genera
Gnaphalieae
Flora of Western Australia
Taxa named by William Hemsley (botanist)